Pomfret is a surname, and may refer to:

 Ernie Pomfret (1941–2001), British steeplechase runner
 John Pomfret (poet) (1667–1702), English 17th-century poet and clergyman
 John Pomfret (journalist) (born 1959), formerly The Washington Post’s bureau chief in Beijing and Los Angeles, and author of Chinese Lessons
 John Edwin Pomfret (1898–1981), American college president 
 Scott Pomfret, American securities lawyer
 William Pomfret (1823–1902), English banker and politician

See also
Earl of Pomfret